This is a list of the mammal species recorded in Turkmenistan. There are eighty-three mammal species in Turkmenistan, of which one is critically endangered, three are endangered, twelve are vulnerable, and five are near threatened.

The following tags are used to highlight each species' conservation status as assessed by the International Union for Conservation of Nature:

Order: Artiodactyla (even-toed ungulates) 

The even-toed ungulates are ungulates whose weight is borne about equally by the third and fourth toes, rather than mostly or entirely by the third as in perissodactyls. There are about 220 artiodactyl species, including many that are of great economic importance to humans.
Family: Cervidae (deer)
Subfamily: Cervinae
Genus: Cervus
Central Asian red deer C. hanglu 
Bactrian deer, C. h. bactrianus
Family: Bovidae (cattle, antelope, sheep, goats)
Subfamily: Antilopinae
Genus: Gazella
Goitered gazelle, G. subgutturosa 
Genus: Saiga
Saiga antelope, S. tatarica 
Subfamily: Caprinae
Genus: Capra
Wild goat, C. aegagrus 
Markhor, C. falconeri 
Genus: Ovis
Urial, O. vignei 
Family: Suidae (pigs)
Subfamily: Suinae
Genus: Sus
Wild boar, S. scrofa

Order: Carnivora (carnivorans) 

There are over 260 species of carnivorans, the majority of which feed primarily on meat. They have a characteristic skull shape and dentition. 
Suborder: Feliformia
Family: Felidae (cats)
Subfamily: Felinae
Genus: Caracal
Caracal, C. caracal 
Genus: Felis
Jungle cat, F. chaus 
African wildcat, F. lybica 
Asiatic wildcat, F. l. ornata
Sand cat, F. margarita 
Turkestan sand cat, F. m. thinobia
Genus: Lynx
Eurasian lynx, L. lynx 
Genus: Otocolobus
Pallas's cat, O. manul 
Subfamily: Pantherinae
Genus: Panthera
Leopard, P. pardus 
Persian leopard, P. p. tulliana 
Family: Hyaenidae (hyaenas)
Genus: Hyaena
Striped hyena, H. hyaena 
Suborder: Caniformia
Family: Canidae (dogs, foxes)
Genus: Canis
Golden jackal, C. aureus 
Gray wolf, C. lupus 
Genus: Vulpes
Blanford's fox, V. cana 
Corsac fox, V. corsac 
Red fox, V. vulpes 
Family: Ursidae (bears)
Genus: Ursus
Brown bear, U. arctos  presence uncertain
 Syrian brown bear, U. a. syriacus  presence uncertain
Family: Mustelidae (mustelids)
Genus: Lutra
Eurasian otter, L. lutra 
Genus: Martes
Beech marten, M. foina 
Genus: Meles
Caucasian badger, M. canescens 
Genus: Mellivora
Honey badger, M. capensis 
Genus: Mustela
Steppe polecat, M. eversmannii 
Least weasel, M. nivalis 
Genus: Vormela
Marbled polecat, V. peregusna 
Family: Phocidae (earless seals)
Genus: Pusa
 Caspian seal, P. caspica

Order: Chiroptera (bats) 

The bats' most distinguishing feature is that their forelimbs are developed as wings, making them the only mammals capable of flight. Bat species account for about 20% of all mammals.
Family: Vespertilionidae
Subfamily: Myotinae
Genus: Myotis
Lesser mouse-eared bat, M. blythii 
Geoffroy's bat, M. emarginatus 
Natterer's bat, M. nattereri 
Subfamily: Vespertilioninae
Genus: Eptesicus
 Bobrinski's serotine, E. bobrinskoi 
 Botta's serotine, E. bottae 
Subfamily: Miniopterinae
Genus: Miniopterus
Common bent-wing bat, M. schreibersii 
Family: Molossidae
Genus: Tadarida
European free-tailed bat, T. teniotis 
Family: Rhinolophidae
Subfamily: Rhinolophinae
Genus: Rhinolophus
Blasius's horseshoe bat, R. blasii 
 Bokhara horseshoe bat, R. bocharicus 
Mediterranean horseshoe bat, R. euryale 
Greater horseshoe bat, R. ferrumequinum 
Lesser horseshoe bat, R. hipposideros

Order: Erinaceomorpha (hedgehogs and gymnures) 

The order Erinaceomorpha contains a single family, Erinaceidae, which comprise the hedgehogs and gymnures. The hedgehogs are easily recognised by their spines while gymnures look more like large rats.

Family: Erinaceidae (hedgehogs)
Subfamily: Erinaceinae
Genus: Hemiechinus
 Long-eared hedgehog, H. auritus 
Genus: Paraechinus
 Brandt's hedgehog, P. hypomelas

Order: Lagomorpha (lagomorphs) 

The lagomorphs comprise two families, Leporidae (hares and rabbits), and Ochotonidae (pikas). Though they can resemble rodents, and were classified as a superfamily in that order until the early 20th century, they have since been considered a separate order. They differ from rodents in a number of physical characteristics, such as having four incisors in the upper jaw rather than two.

Family: Leporidae (hares etc.)
Genus: Lepus
 Tolai hare, L. tolai 
Family: Ochotonidae (pikas)
Genus: Ochotona
 Afghan pika, O. rufescens

Order: Perissodactyla (odd-toed ungulates) 

The odd-toed ungulates are browsing and grazing mammals. They are usually large to very large, and have relatively simple stomachs and a large middle toe.
Family: Equidae (horses etc.)
Genus: Equus
 Onager, E. hemionus 
Turkmenian kulan, E. h. kulan

Order: Rodentia (rodents) 

Rodents make up the largest order of mammals, with over 40% of mammalian species. They have two incisors in the upper and lower jaw which grow continually and must be kept short by gnawing.

Suborder: Sciurognathi
Family: Sciuridae (squirrels)
Subfamily: Xerinae
Tribe: Xerini
Genus: Spermophilopsis
 Long-clawed ground squirrel, S. leptodactylus 
Tribe: Marmotini
Genus: Marmota
 Menzbier's marmot, M. menzbieri 
Genus: Spermophilus
 Yellow ground squirrel, Spermophilus fulvus
Family: Gliridae (dormice)
Subfamily: Leithiinae
Genus: Dryomys
 Forest dormouse, Dryomys nitedula
Genus: Myomimus
 Masked mouse-tailed dormouse, Myomimus personatus VU
Subfamily: Glirinae
Genus: Glis
 Iranian edible dormouse, Glis persicus
Family: Dipodidae (jerboas)
Subfamily: Allactaginae
Genus: Allactaga
 Small five-toed jerboa, Allactaga elater
 Great jerboa, Allactaga major
 Severtzov's jerboa, Allactaga severtzovi
 Mongolian five-toed jerboa, Allactaga sibirica
Genus: Allactodipus
 Bobrinski's jerboa, Allactodipus bobrinskii
Subfamily: Dipodinae
Genus: Dipus
 Northern three-toed jerboa, Dipus sagitta
Genus: Eremodipus
 Lichtenstein's jerboa, Eremodipus lichtensteini
Genus: Jaculus
 Turkmen jerboa, Jaculus turcmenicus
Genus: Paradipus
 Comb-toed jerboa, Paradipus ctenodactylus
Genus: Stylodipus
 Thick-tailed three-toed jerboa, Stylodipus telum
Family: Calomyscidae
Genus: Calomyscus
 Great Balkhan mouse-like hamster, Calomyscus mystax
Family: Cricetidae
Subfamily: Arvicolinae
Genus: Blanfordimys
 Afghan vole, Blanfordimys afghanus
Genus: Ellobius
 Southern mole vole, Ellobius fuscocapillus
 Northern mole vole, Ellobius talpinus
 Zaisan mole vole, Ellobius tancrei
Genus: Microtus
 Persian vole, Microtus irani
 Tien Shan vole, Microtus kirgisorum
 Transcaspian vole, Microtus transcaspicus
Family: Muridae (mice, rats, voles, gerbils, hamsters)
Subfamily: Gerbillinae
Genus: Meriones
 Libyan jird, Meriones libycus LC
 Midday jird, Meriones meridianus
 Persian jird, Meriones persicus
 Tamarisk jird, Meriones tamariscinus
 Zarudny's jird, Meriones zarudnyi EN
Genus: Rhombomys
 Great gerbil, Rhombomys opimus LC
Subfamily: Murinae
Genus: Nesokia
 Short-tailed bandicoot rat, Nesokia indica LC

Order: Soricomorpha (shrews, moles, and solenodons) 

The "shrew-forms" are insectivorous mammals. The shrews and solenodons closely resemble mice while the moles are stout-bodied burrowers.

Family: Soricidae (shrews)
Subfamily: Crocidurinae
Genus: Crocidura
Lesser white-toothed shrew, C. suaveolens 
Genus: Diplomesodon
 Piebald shrew, D. pulchellum 
Subfamily: Soricinae
Tribe: Soricini
Genus: Sorex
 Eurasian pygmy shrew, S. minutus

Locally extinct 
The following species are locally extinct in the country:
 Cheetah, Acinonyx jubatus
 Tiger, Panthera tigris

See also
List of chordate orders
Lists of mammals by region
Mammal classification

References

Further reading

External links

M
Mammals
Turkmenistan
 
Turkmenistan